Rama is the legendary Indian king regarded as an incarnation of Vishnu.

Rama may also refer to:

Within the scriptures of India
 Parashurama (Rama with an axe), a partial incarnation of Vishnu
 Balarama (the strong Rama), brother of Krishna
 another name of Lakshmi

People

Kings
 Rama (Kings of Thailand)
 Ram Khamhaeng (1279–1298)
 Ramathibodi I (1350–1369), Uthong
 Ramathibodi II (1491–1529), Chettathirat
 Ramathibodi III, the Great (1656–1688), Narai
 Rama I, the Great (1782–1809), Buddha Yodfa Chulaloke
 Rama II of Siam (1809–1824), Buddha Loetla Nabhalai 
 Rama III (1824–1851), Nangklao
 Rama IV (1851–1868), Mongkut 
 Rama V, the Great (1868–1910), Chulalongkorn 
 Rama VI (1910–1925), Vajiravudh 
 Rama VII (1925–1935), Prajadhipok 
 Rama VIII (1935–1946), Ananda Mahidol 
 Rama IX, the Great (1946–2016), Bhumibol Adulyadej
 Rama X (2016–present), Vajiralongkorn

Rulers of Cambodia
 Barom Reameathibtei (1363–1373), Borommarama
 Ramathipadi I (1642–1658), Ponhea Chan
 Barom Ramadhipati (1700–1701/1710–1722), Ang Em
 Ramathipadi III (1748–1749/1756–1757), Ang Tong
 Ramathipadi IV (1775–1779), Ang Non

Rulers of the Hanthawaddy Kingdom
 Binnya Ran I (1424–1446)
 Binnya Ran II (1492–1526)

Rulers of the Kingdom of Cochin
 Rama Varma VIII (1775–1790)
 Rama Varma IX (1790–1805)
 Rama Varma X (1805–1809)
 Rama Varma XI (1828–1837)
 Rama Varma XII (1837–1844)
 Rama Varma XIII (1844–1851)
 Rama Varma XIV (1864–1888)
 Rama Varma XV (1895–1914)
 Rama Varma XVI (1915–1932)
 Rama Varma XVII (1932–1941)

King of Rama, title used by the Kings of Hungary

Other people
 Rama (actress), Indian film actress
 Annabelle Rama (born 1952), Filipina actress
 Edi Rama (born 1964), Albanian politician and artist
 Rama Government, the cabinet formed by Rama after he was elected as prime minister
 Mike Rama (born 1954), Filipino politician
 N. T. Rama Rao (1923–1996), Indian film actor, director, producer, and politician
 N. T. Rama Rao Jr. (b. 1983), Indian Telugu film actor
 Rezart Rama (born 2000), Albanian footballer

Historical personalities
 Nityananda Rama, the Vaishnava saint
 "The Rama" (1530–1572), Jewish religious teacher Moses Isserles
 Frederick Lenz, a spiritual teacher who used Rama as his teaching name

Places
Rəmə, Azerbaijan
Rama (Gaul), a town in ancient Gaul
Rama, Bosnia and Herzegovina, a historical region of Bosnia and Herzegovina
Rama, Ethiopia
Rama, Jenin, a Palestinian village in the Jenin Governorate
Rama, Ontario, Canada
Rama, Saskatchewan, Canada
Rama Lake (Bosnia and Herzegovina), near Prozor
Rama Lake (Pakistan), a lake near Astore, Pakistan
Rama River (disambiguation), several rivers
Ramatha (or Rama), a former Roman Catholic titular bishopric in Palestine
El Rama, a municipality in the South Caribbean Coast Autonomous Region, Nicaragua
Rameh, a town in northern Israel
Al-Ram, a town near Jerusalem

Entertainment
 Rama (character), a DC Comics Indian superhero based on the Hindu god
 Ramachandra (film), a 2003 film
 Rendezvous with Rama, the first in a series of books known as the "Rama series" by Arthur C. Clarke and Gentry Lee
 Rama (video game), a 1997 video game based on the books

Other uses
 Rama (fish), a genus of catfish
 Rama (food), a brand of margarine
 Rama people, in Nicaragua
 Rama language, spoken by the Rama people
 Rama Records, a record label
 Research Moored Array for African-Asian-Australian Monsoon Analysis and Prediction (RAMA)
 Order of Rama, a Thai military award
 RAMa (Régiment d'Artillerie de Marine), a type of formation in the French Army, such as
 1st Marine Artillery Regiment (1st RAMa)
 11th Marine Artillery Regiment (11th RAMa)
 a previous name of the interstellar object ʻOumuamua

See also
 Ramachandra (disambiguation)
 Ramah (disambiguation)
 Raman (disambiguation)

Hindu given names
Sanskrit-language names
Indian given names
Telugu names
Indonesian given names
Filipino given names